The Cup of Ukrainian PFL 2009 is the first season of Professional Football League of Ukraine knockout competition, currently known as Cup of PFL or Kubok of PFL.

The Cup began with a semi-final round where teams, representing each division of the PFL, participated. The winners of that round advanced to the finals and the losing teams to the match for the third place.

The competition took place at the sport arena of the FC Kniazha Schaslyve.

Participating teams
Ukrainian First League

Taras Mikush (Enerhetyk), Kyktiev (Zakarpattia), Mykola Revutskyi, Ihor Khudobyak (both - Prykarpattia), Maksym Syrota, Andriy Herasymenko, Oleksandr Nikitin, Anton Lysiuk (all - Olexandria), Vladyslav Chanhelia, Serhiy Yavorskyi (both - Obolon), Chabak (Desna), Yuri Fedorchuk (Volyn). Coach - Yuri Koval.

Ukrainian Second League Group A
Bahlay (Arsenal BT), Kinakh, Herheliuk, Serhiychuk (all - Veres), Paskiv, Drahan, Basarab (all - Nyva V), Virkovskyi, Sokil, Putrash (all - Nyva T), Nalikashvili, Dorohan (both - Ros), Bielov (CSKA), Naiko, Adamenko, Bovtrun, Kazakov, Kolodiazhnyi, Duda, Syrynnyk (all - Nafkom). Coach - Oleh Fedorchuk.

Ukrainian Second League Group B
Savchenko, Taranukha (both - OLKOM), Maksym Leschenko, Roman Yemelyanov (both - Arsenal Kh), Klymentovskyi, Kozlov (both - Tytan A), Vasyl Klimov, Dmytro Voloshyn (both - Kremin), Novytskyi, Potyvtsev, Korayuk, Berezovskyi (all - Zirka), Sharko (Hirnyk-Sport), Shevchenko, Khomchenovskyi, Sikulskyi (all - Olimpik). Coach - Ihor Zhabchenko.

Ukrainian Student Football League
Coach - Volodymyr Lozynskyi.

Competition

Semi-finals

Final round

Third-place game

Final

Top goalscorers
Status on March 3, 2009

Statistics can be found at PFL web-site.

References

External links
 Official web-site of PFL Ukraine 

2009
PFL Cup
PFL Cup